The following elections occurred in the year 1826.

 1826 Chilean presidential election

North America

United States
 1826 Illinois gubernatorial election
 1826 New York gubernatorial election
 1826 and 1827 United States House of Representatives elections
 United States Senate election in New York, 1825/1826
 1826 and 1827 United States Senate elections

Europe

United Kingdom
 1826 United Kingdom general election

South America

Argentina 
 1826 Argentine presidential election

See also
 :Category:1826 elections

1826
Elections